Ruleholme is a small hamlet on the A689 road and the River Irthing, near the village of Irthington, in the City of Carlisle district, in the English county of Cumbria (historically in Cumberland). It is also near Carlisle Lake District Airport.

Location 
Ruleholme is located in between the city of Carlisle, to the west and the town of Brampton, to the East on the A689 road.

Amenities 
Ruleholme has a pub called The Golden Fleece.

Bridges 
Ruleholme has two bridges both crossing the River Irthing. Ruleholme Bridge is a bridge on a minor road which is the original bridge and was by-passed. The route is now blocked off on one side of the Bridge. Ruleholme New Bridge is a bridge carrying the A689 road traffic, built to by-pass the longer, older route of Ruleholme Bridge.

References 

 Carlisle A-Z (page 7)

External links 

Hamlets in Cumbria
Irthington